Yarrawonga is the name of several Australian places:

Yarrawonga, Northern Territory, an industrial suburb of Palmerston, Northern Territory
Yarrawonga, Queensland, a suburb of Townsville, Queensland
Yarrawonga, Victoria, a town in northern Victoria
Yarrawonga Airport

See also
Yarrawonga Park, New South Wales